, provisional designation , is a trans-Neptunian object from the classical Kuiper belt located in the outermost region of the Solar System. The cubewano belongs to the orbitally unexcited cold population. It was discovered on 15 April 1994, by astronomers David Jewitt and Jun Chen at the Mauna Kea Observatories, near Hilo, Hawaii.

Description 

, it is 43.3 AU from the Sun. Very little is known about the object. Based on the brightness and distance, it is estimated to be between 100 and 150 km in diameter depending on the albedo.

 is the second cubewano to be given an official Minor Planet Center catalog number. The first cubewano is 15760 Albion.

References

External links 
 List of Transneptunian Objects, Minor Planet Center
 
 

015807
Discoveries by David C. Jewitt
Discoveries by Jun Chen (astronomer)
19940415